Barclay de Tolly is the name of a Baltic German noble family of Scottish origin (Clan Barclay). During the time of the Revolution of 1688 in Britain, the family migrated to Swedish Livonia from Towy (Towie) in Aberdeenshire. Its subsequent generations became a German-speaking family in Livonia, which became part of the Russian Empire after the 1700–1721 Great Northern War.

Weinhold Gotthard Barclay de Tolly (1734–1781) was a poruchik of the Russian Army and a descendant of one of the burgomasters of Riga. He was the first of his family to be accepted into the Russian nobility. He was married to Margaretha Elisabeth von Smitten (1733–1771), and they had four sons: Emil Johann, a General in the Russian service; B. Michael Bogdanovitch; C. Andrei Bogdanovitch, a Colonel; and Michael Bogdanovitch (known as Prince Michael Andreas Barclay de Tolly), a very prominent military commander who was made a count in 1813 and a prince in 1815 by Alexander I of Russia.

After the extinction of the original Barclay de Tolly princely line upon the death in 1871 of Prince Michael's son, Magnus, Alexander II of Russia allowed Prince Michael's sister's grandson (through female lineage), Alexander von Weymarn, to assume the title of Prince Barclay de Tolly-Weymarn in 1872.

Notable family members 
 Prince Michael Andreas Barclay de Tolly  ( – ) was an Imperial Russian Field Marshal and Minister of War during Napoleon's invasion in 1812 and War of the Sixth Coalition. He implemented a number of reforms during this time which improved the supply system in the army, doubled the number of army troops, and implemented new combat training principles. He was also the Governor-General of Finland. 
 Prince Alexander Barclay de Tolly-Weymarn (December 22, 1824 – May 8, 1905) was an Imperial Russian regiment commander, division commander and corps commander. He was the son of Wilhelm Peter Jost von Weymarn and great-nephew of Prince Michael Andreas Barclay de Tolly. He married Marie Friederike von Seddeler in 1849 and had three children: daughters Alexandrine (Ada) Auguste Olga Barclay de Tolly-Weymarn and Marie (Mira) Georgia Augusta Barclay de Tolly-Weymarn, and son Ludwig (Louis) Alexander Michael Barclay de Tolly-Weymarn.

Sources 
Josselson, M., & Josselson, D. (1980). The commander : a life of Barclay de Tolly. Oxford University Press.

Notes 

Russian noble families
Russian families of Scottish origin
Livonian noble families